The Manxman (also known as The Manx-Man) is a 1916 British silent drama film directed by George Loane Tucker and starring Elisabeth Risdon, Henry Ainley and Fred Groves. It is based on the 1894 novel of the same name by Hall Caine. A second silent adaptation, directed by Alfred Hitchcock, was released in 1929.

Upon its release in England in December 1916, The Manxman was a financial and critical success. It was one of relatively few British films to also become a hit in the United States. No copies of the film are known to exist, and The Manxman nitrate was destroyed by a fire in the 1965 MGM vault fire.

Cast
 Elisabeth Risdon - Kate Gregeen
 Henry Ainley - Philip Christian
 Fred Groves - Pete Quillian
 Adeline Hayden Coffin - Governor's wife
 Will Corrie - Fisherman
 John Marlborough East - Casar Cregeen
 Kenelm Foss - Ross Christian
 Lewis Gilbert - Black Tom
 Minna Grey - Mona
 Gwynne Herbert - Aunt Nan
 Philip Hewland - Governor
 Mary Merrall - Tom's girl
 John Milton - Quiggan
 Guy Newall - Secretary
 Edward O'Neill - Iron Christian
 Frank Stanmore - Kelley
 Hubert Willis - Clerk
 Bert Wynne - Peter Christian

Production notes
Produced by the London Film Company, The Manxman was filmed on location on the Isle of Man.

References

External links
 
 

1916 films
1916 drama films
British drama films
British silent feature films
Films based on British novels
Films directed by George Loane Tucker
Films set in the British Empire
Films set on the Isle of Man
Films shot in the Isle of Man
Goldwyn Pictures films
Lost British films
British black-and-white films
1916 lost films
Lost drama films
1917 drama films
1917 films
1910s American films
1910s British films